The Men's 200 Butterfly event at the 10th FINA World Aquatics Championships swam 22 – 23 July 2003 in Barcelona, Spain. Preliminary and Semifinal heats were on July 22, with the preliminaries during the morning session and the semifinals during the evening session. The Final swam during the evening session on July 23.

At the start of the event, the existing World (WR) and Championship (CR) records were both:
WR and CR: 1:54.58 swum by Michael Phelps (USA) on 24 July 2001 in Fukuoka, Japan

Results

Final

Semifinals

Preliminaries

References

Swimming at the 2003 World Aquatics Championships